The Marion was an automobile produced by the Marion Motor Car Company in Indianapolis (Marion County), Indiana from 1904 to 1915.

Marion was also used for prototype automobiles in 1901 by the Marion Automobile Company of Marion, Ohio, which later operated as a garage.  A Marion Flyer was listed in 1910 by the Marion Automobile & Manufacturing Company in Marion, Indiana, but no production was reported.

History 
In 1904 the Marion Motor Car Company, based in Indianapolis,entered automobile production building mid-priced to high-priced automobiles.  

Early versions of the Marion car had transversely-mounted 16-hp Reeves air-cooled engines, and double chain drive. The appearance of the Marion car was very similar to the contemporary Premier (also an Indianapolis car). 1906 Marion cars had conventionally-placed 16 and 28-hp 4-cylinder Reeves engines, while later Marion cars used water-cooled engines by Continental and other firms of up to 48-hp.

Automotive engineers and designers, Robert Hassler, Fred Tone, George Schebler and  Harry C. Stutz produced or designed models for Marion.  Motor car racing was actively undertaken to provide recognition for Marion.  Beginning in 1907 Harry Stutz was chief engineer for Marion.  He designed a roadster named the Bobcat Speedster, which bore a close resemblance to the contemporaneous Stutz Bearcat Speedster.

John N. Willys, President of Overland Automobile Company, bought controlling interest in Marion in October, 1908. The Marion Motor Car Company remained under-capitalized until 1912, when capital stock was raised from $100,000 to $1,125,0000.  J. I. Handley, president of American Motor Car Company became President of Marion Motor Car Company and combined their sales organizations.

In 1914 J.I. Handley purchased the assets of the Marion Company for $120,000.  In December 1914, J.I. Handley's Mutual Motors Company resulted from a merger between Marion Motor Car Company and Imperial Automobile Company of Jackson, Michigan. Marion production was moved to Jackson, but ended in 1915.  In 1916, the Marion-Handley became the automobile offered by Mutual Motors.

The Marion Motor Car Company manufactured 7,158 automobiles in all.

Models 
A prototype Marion roadster with a 9,455cc V12 engine was designed by George Schebler of carburetor fame, and built in the Marion factory in 1908.

In 1910, Harry C. Stutz developed his idea for a factory-built speedster called the Bobcat. They were designed as minimalist, stripped down vehicles that were fitted with the most powerful engine offered by Marion.  The wheelbase measured 111-inches, had two-wheel mechanical brakes, and sold for $1,475,.  The Marion Bobcat Speedster was produced from 1911 through 1914.

Marions were available as touring cars or roadsters, and from 1911 as sedans and coupes.

Marion Models:

Gallery

See also
List of defunct automobile manufacturers
Marion Bobcat Speedsters at ConceptCarz
Marion Motor Car Company - Notes from the Indiana Archives
1912 Marion Bobcat Speedster - Hemmings Article

Defunct motor vehicle manufacturers of the United States
Motor vehicle manufacturers based in Indiana
Defunct manufacturing companies based in Indiana
1900s cars
1910s cars
Brass Era vehicles

References 

Cars introduced in 1904
Manufacturing companies established in 1904
Manufacturing companies disestablished in 1915